Italic  may refer to:

Italy
 Italic peoples, Italic-language speaking people of ancient Italy
 Italic languages, an Indo-European language family
 Old Italic alphabet, an alphabet of ancient Italy

Calligraphy and typography
 Italic script, a method of handwriting
 Italic type, used in typography mainly for emphasis

Other
 The Italic or Composite order
 Italic (company)

See also
 Italica
 
 
 Italian (disambiguation)

Language and nationality disambiguation pages